Dumitru Ivan (14 May 1938 – 17 June 2015) was a Romanian football left back.

Club career
Dumitru Ivan was born on 14 May 1938 in București and started to play football in 1955 at the junior squads of Locomotiva București. in 1959 he started his senior career at Divizia B team, Dinamo Obor București, transferring after one season at Dinamo București, making his Divizia A debut on 19 June 1960 in a 3–1 away loss against Farul Constanța, spending a total 8 seasons at the club, winning four consecutive Divizia A titles from 1962 until 1965, in the first he played 26 matches, in the second he played 25 games and scored one goal, in the last two he made 19 appearances in each. He also won the 1963–64 Cupa României with The Red Dogs and represented them in 10 European Cup matches, transferring in 1967 at Argeș Pitești where on 7 December 1969 he made his last Divizia A appearance in a 2–2 against Universitatea Craiova, a competition in which he gained a total of 163 appearances with two goals scored, also he played six games in the Inter-Cities Fairs Cup for Argeș. In 1970, Ivan went to play in West Germany at TUS Wansee for five seasons, after which he retired from his playing career. Dumitru Ivan died in 17 June 2015 at age 77 in his home from București, after suffering from cirrhosis and diabetes.

International career
Dumitru Ivan played 6 matches at international level for Romania, making his debut on 8 October 1961 under coach Gheorghe Popescu I in a friendly which ended with a 4–0 victory against Turkey. His following game was a 3–1 victory against Spain at the 1964 European Nations' Cup qualifiers. Ivan's following matches were friendlies, the last one being a 0–0 against Turkey played on 9 October 1963. He also played for Romania's Olympic team, competing in the men's tournament at the 1964 Summer Olympics where he played in a 1–1 against Iran from the group stage, the team finishing the competition on the 5th place.

Honours
Dinamo București
Divizia A: 1961–62, 1962–63, 1963–64, 1964–65
Cupa României: 1963–64

Notes

References

External links

1938 births
2015 deaths
Romanian footballers
Romania international footballers
Olympic footballers of Romania
Footballers at the 1964 Summer Olympics
FC Rapid București players
Victoria București players
FC Dinamo București players
FC Argeș Pitești players
Liga I players
Liga II players
Footballers from Bucharest
Romanian expatriate footballers
Expatriate footballers in West Germany
Romanian expatriate sportspeople in West Germany
Association football fullbacks